The 1994 UCF Golden Knights football season was the sixteenth season for the team and Gene McDowell's tenth as the head coach of the Golden Knights. After the Golden Knight's impressive 1993 season, UCF was selected as the preseason #1 to start the 1994 season. The 1994 season would prove disappointing however, as the Golden Knights would finish the season ranked #20 with a 7–4 record.

The school's famous campus homecoming tradition "Spirit Splash" began (by chance) in 1994.

Schedule

Roster

References

UCF
UCF Knights football seasons
UCF Golden Knights football